The Penetang Kings are a junior ice hockey team based in Penetanguishene, Ontario, Canada.  They play in the Provincial Junior Hockey League (PJHL) in the Carruthers division in the Ontario Hockey Association.

History
The first chapter of current Penetanguishene junior hockey history came in 1973.  The Penetang Hurons joined up with the Central Ontario Junior C Hockey League, a league recently promoted from the Junior D level.  The Hurons lasted only two seasons before folding.

In 1977, two years after the demise of the Hurons.  The Penetang Kings were created as members of the Georgian Bay Junior C Hockey League.

In 1983-84, the Penetang won the Georgian Bay league championship to move into the All-Ontario playdowns.  They made it all the way to the Clarence Schmalz Cup finals, where they played against the Niagara Junior C Hockey League champions, the Woodstock Navy-Vets.  The Kings brushed them off with a 4-game-sweep to clinch their first ever provincial championship.  The Kings were led to the Cup by local player and future National Hockey Leaguer Brian McReynolds, who the next year won the Manitoba Centennial Cup National Junior A Championship with the Orillia Travelways of the OHA Junior A Hockey League.

In 1994, the Georgian Bay league merged with the Mid-Ontario Junior C Hockey League to create the Georgian Mid-Ontario Junior C Hockey League.  Although the Kings were rather competitive in the league, success has not come until recently.

The 2005-06 season saw the Kings finish the regular season in first place.  In the league quarter-finals, the Kings were placed against the eighth place Midland Flyers and swept them 4-games-to-none.  The semi-final was against the sixth seeded Stayner Siskins.  The Kings dispatched them 4-games-to-1 to move on to the Georgian Mid-Ontario finals.  The Kings were up against the powerhouse Fergus Devils, but it in surprising fashion swept the second seeded Devils 4-games-to-none to win their first ever Georgian Mid-Ontario championship.  The Kings found themselves in the All-Ontario playdowns for the first time possibly twenty-two years.  Their quarter-final match up was against the Kincardine Bulldogs of the Western Junior C Hockey League.  In their hardest challenge yet, they bested the Bulldogs 4-games-to-2.  In the semi-finals, the Kings ran into the Central Junior C Hockey League's Port Perry Mojacks.  The Kings dispatched the Mojacks 4-games-to-2 to reach their first Clarence Schmalz Cup final in twenty-two years.  The Kings were up against a heavily favoured Essex 73's squad.  The 73's had torn up the Great Lakes Junior C Hockey League and swept the Niagara Junior C Hockey League's Simcoe Storm to reach the final.  Penetang's goalie, Dan Earles, took over and post three 1-0 shutouts in a 4-games-to-1 series victory over the 73's.

The 2006-07 season was more of a challenge than ever.  After coming in second place in the regular season to the Fergus Devils, the Kings again had to face the Midland Flyers in the quarter-finals and again swept them 4-games-to-none.  In the semi-final, the Kings were challenged by a tough Alliston Hornets squad.  After going up 3-games-to-none in the series, the Hornets battled back to make the series 3-games-to-2 before the Kings finally won a tight game 6 and kill the Hornet surge thanks to 2 late game points.  This set up a rematch of the 2006-07 GMO Final.  Fergus came out tough, but were beaten in the first two games both in double overtime, both times by a 3-2 score.  The Devils came back and won game 3 and game 4 just to have the Kings win game 5 and then game 6 4-3 in overtime.  Four of the six games played in the Final were finished in overtime.  In the Semi-final, the Kings again ran into the Kincardine Bulldogs of the Western Junior C Hockey League.  By game 4, the Bulldogs had the Kings against the wall with a 3-games-to-1 series lead.  To the Bulldogs dismay, the Kings won game 5 2-1, game 6 3-1, and then game 7 with a crushing 5-0 victory.  In the semi-final, the Kings drew the Central Junior C Hockey League's Lakefield Chiefs and in an extremely close series, swept the Chiefs 4-games-to-none to reach the All-Ontario Final for the second straight year.  Again, their opponent was the Great Lakes Junior C Hockey League's Essex 73's.  In the Final, the 73's got the one-up on the Kings in game 1, taking it 4-3.  From that point on, with again excellent backstopping from Dan Earles, the Kings dismantled the 73's.  They won the next 4 games straight to win the series 4-games-to-1 and clinch their second straight Clarence Schmalz Cup.

Season-by-season standings

(*) Standings Incomplete.
2000-2004
2004–Present

Clarence Schmalz Cup appearances
1984: Penetang Kings defeated Woodstock Navy-Vets 4-games-to-none
2006: Penetang Kings defeated Essex 73's 4-games-to-1
2007: Penetang Kings defeated Essex 73's 4-games-to-1

Notable alumni
Brian McReynolds
Andre Benoit

References

External links
Kings Homepage

Georgian Mid-Ontario Junior C Hockey League teams
Penetanguishene